Janet Leung (born April 25, 1994) is a Canadian, medal-winning Olympian, and professional softball player for the Canadian Wild of the National Pro Fastpitch (NPF). She played collegiately at Brown University from 2012-2016 and earned All-Ivy all four years. She has been a member of Canada women's national softball team since 2017 and helped the team make history by winning Canada’s first medal in the sport at the 2020 Summer Olympics.

Career
Leung played college softball for the Brown Bears in the Ivy League from 2012 to 2016.

Leung competed at the 2019 Pan American Games in Lima, winning silver. 

In June 2021, Leung was named to Canada's 2020 Olympic team. During the Olympics, Leung had two hits and one walk, recording one of her hits during the bronze medal game and scoring the winning run to help Canada defeat Team Mexico.

References

External links
 Brown Bears bio

1994 births
Living people
Canadian softball players
Competitors at the 2022 World Games
Sportspeople from Mississauga
Softball players at the 2019 Pan American Games
Medalists at the 2019 Pan American Games
Pan American Games silver medalists for Canada
Brown Bears softball players
Canadian expatriate sportspeople in the United States
Softball players at the 2020 Summer Olympics
Olympic softball players of Canada
Medalists at the 2020 Summer Olympics
Olympic bronze medalists for Canada
Olympic medalists in softball
Pan American Games medalists in softball